The Dinsmore Homestead is a historic house museum. The property contains a house completed in 1842 and several outbuildings.

Overview
He and his family, which included daughters, Isabella Dinsmore, Julia Dinsmore, and Susan Dinsmore, settled there, and with the help of slave labor, raised sheep and grew grapes and willows for a basket-making business that was overseen by German immigrants.

The house is notable for containing all original artifacts that were purchased by the family primarily in Cincinnati, Ohio, and southern Indiana. Some of the stores they shopped at over the years included Shillito's, McAlpin's, Gest & Bruns, and Hunnewell, Hill & Co., all early Cincinnati establishments.

The primary sources belonging to the Foundation allow docents to highlight the Dinsmore family's connections to people like:  George Washington, Alexander Macomb, Silas Dinsmoor, James Bowie, John Bell, Samuel Bell, John Ross, Henry Clay, Andrew Jackson, General Alexander Macomb, Margaret Coxe, Mathew Brady, Nellie Taft, Enid Yandell, Tyrone Power, Sarah Gibson Humphreys, Benjamin F. Goodrich, Randall L. Gibson, Julia Marlowe, Charles E. Flandrau, Charles M. Flandrau, Grace Flandrau, John W. Riddle, Theodate Pope Riddle, David Goodrich, Robert H. M. Ferguson, Ronald Munro Ferguson, John Jacob Astor IV, Isabella Selmes Ferguson Greenway King, John Campbell Greenway, Theodore Roosevelt, Henry Cabot Lodge, Corinne Roosevelt Robinson, Douglas Robinson, Bamie Roosevelt, Eleanor Roosevelt, Franklin D. Roosevelt, Corinne Robinson Alsop, William Loving, James Henry Breasted, Gutzon Borglum.

The Dinsmore family, who lived in the historic home from 1842 through 1926, were associated with many historical events and trends that help to inform an understanding of local, regional, national, and global history. Some of the interesting events members of the family were involved in and wrote about include: relations between the U. S. Government and the Cherokee and Choctaw, early Republic land speculations, (for example, Macomb's Purchase), the Texas Revolution of 1836, Early Republic politics, the Adams Express Company, the American Civil War, the Spanish–American War, the sinking of the Titanic, the sinking of the Lusitania, and World War I.

Current use
A collection of nearly 90,000 pages of family letters, journals and business records have been preserved on microfilm for use at the Dinsmore Homestead.

The home is open for guided tours and the grounds are open to the public.

Significant focal points of the Homestead's history include, but are not limited to women's history, African American history, the history of slavery and Reconstruction, Native American history, agricultural history, and the histories of Mississippi, Louisiana, and Kentucky.

References

External links

 Dinsmore Homestead
 Discover Northern Kentucky: Dinsmore Homestead Part I
 Discover Northern Kentucky: Dinsmore Homestead Part II

National Register of Historic Places in Boone County, Kentucky
Houses completed in 1842
Historic house museums in Kentucky
Museums in Boone County, Kentucky
Houses on the National Register of Historic Places in Kentucky
Houses in Boone County, Kentucky
1842 establishments in Kentucky